Agua Hedionda may refer to:
 The Agua Hedionda Spa, a mineral spring day spa in Cuautla, Mexico
 The Agua Hedionda Lagoon, a lagoon in Carlsbad, California
 Rancho Agua Hedionda, located in present-day Carlsbad, California, and encompassing the aforementioned Agua Hedionda Lagoon